Third country resettlement or refugee resettlement is, according to the UNHCR, one of three durable solutions (voluntary repatriation and local integration being the other two) for refugees who fled their home country. Resettled refugees have the right to reside long-term or permanent in the country of resettlement and may also have the right to become citizens of that country.

Resettled refugees may also be referred to as quota or contingent refugees, as countries only take a certain number of refugees each year. In 2016 there were 65.6 million forcibly displaced people worldwide and around 190,000 of them were resettled into a third country.

History of resettlement
 The International Refugee Organization resettled over 1 million refugees between 1947 and 1951. They were scattered throughout Europe after World War II. (Most of the German refugees were incorporated into West and East Germany). 80% of them were resettled outside Europe. An example for those resettled within Europe are the 150,000 Polish soldiers and their families who were resettled in the UK by 1949; most feared retribution from the Soviet authorities.
 Due to the Soviet invasion of Hungary in 1956, 200,000 Hungarians fled to Yugoslavia and Austria. Nearly all 180,000 Hungarians who fled to Austria were resettled to 37 third countries within three years. The Soviet invasion of Czechoslovakia in 1968 had the same effect; many Czechoslovakians fled their country and were subsequently resettled.
 Most of its Asian minority were expelled from Uganda in 1972 and some 40,000 Ugandan Asians were resettled in third countries.
 Following a coup d’état in Chile in 1973, 5,000 refugees from neighbouring countries were resettled.
 650,000 Vietnamese refugees were resettled in the United States during and after the Vietnam War.
 Between April 1992 and June 1997, following the first Gulf War, approximately 21,800 Iraqis were accepted for resettlement from Saudi Arabia.
 In the context of the breakup of Yugoslavia, between 1992 and July 1993 over 11,000 inmates from places of detention in Bosnia and Herzegovina had left for third countries. By June 1997, UNHCR had been directly involved in resettling some 47,000 refugees from former Yugoslavia.
 More than 100,000 refugees from Myanmar have been resettled from the refugee camps in Thailand since 2004 and as many people have been resettled from Malaysia during this same period.

Stages of the resettlement journey
There are three stages of the resettlement journey: Pre-departure happens from their country of origin, departure is the during the process of resettlement and post-arrival happens in their new country.

Pre-departure

Selection according to vulnerability

Precondition for resettlement is to be registered as a refugee with the UNHCR and to have undergone the Refugee Status Determination (RSD) process based on the 1951 Refugee Convention refugee definition. Among those refugees the UNHCR or other organisations (e.g. RefugePoint or HIAS) make referrals for resettlement if they identify a high level of risk and vulnerability whilst being in the first country of asylum. Refugees cannot apply for resettlement themselves. Selection procedures can vary between UNHCR offices but the below criteria are generally used:
 Physical safety and legal rights are at risk in country of asylum
 Past experience of violence and torture
 Significant medical needs that cannot be provided for in country of asylum
 Sex/gender based risks in country of asylum
 Children and adolescents are at risk in country of asylum
 Resettlement is the only way of reuniting a family
 Resettlement is the only way for building a durable future
If one or more of these criteria are met it still needs to be assessed whether third country resettlement is the most appropriate durable solution compared to voluntary return and local integration.

It is also possible for multiple refugees to be submitted for resettlement if they share specific circumstances, such as similar reasons for their flight and no prospects of return. Examples for group resettlement were the Lost Boys of Sudan from Kenya, Liberians from Guinea and Sierra Leone, Burundians from Tanzania and Eritreans from Ethiopia and Saudi Arabia.

Biases in the selection process

Receiving countries tend to use their own criteria for selecting refugees for resettlement. Many governments prioritise women and complete families and deprioritise single males. This happens in order to minimise potential security risks.

Even the UNHCR resettlement officers who submit refugees' dossiers to potential receiving countries may themselves bias the selection. For example, it was revealed that UNHCR staff in Nairobi extorted money from refugees for resettlement places. Apart from that, large families are more likely to be considered for resettlement than singles, because resettlement officers have to work through fewer case files per submitted person when referring large families. Also single men, who are likely to receive a more thorough and time-consuming security screening from resettlement states, are less likely to be submitted.

To be referred for resettlement may involve a tedious game with refugee chairmen, agency personnel or security guards. Chairmen can help making up stories or can ignore real security issues. The refugees themselves may manipulate the selection process. They may not mention that they have recently married in order not to delay their departure or they make themselves younger or older in order to, putatively, increase their chances for resettlement. They may even exaggerate their level of vulnerability as has been noticed in Kakuma: men staged violent attacks on themselves or their dwellings and women pretended rapes; they may be hiding their military or rebel past, or change their ethnicity, in order to belong to a certain persecuted group.

Countries select

After refugees are referred for resettlement and agree to be resettled they are suggested to suitable countries that run resettlement programmes. Each participating government can select from the referrals and refugees themselves cannot choose their country of resettlement. Even though receiving countries should not select refugees according to their own criteria, it may be that societal and political desires influence which groups of refugees are received. Countries make their decisions based on either just a dossier or following an interview with the refugee.
After the selection process is completed there are additional government interviews and security checks. The interview process may be hard for children and young adults. According to the Lost Boys of Sudan study, 74% of the 304 surveyed Sudanese refugees in the local refugee foster care programs affiliated with the US Unaccompanied Refugee Minors Program reported that they found immigration interviews and processing emotionally difficult.

When the security checks are passed, health assessments and a cultural orientation training follow. The latter should emphasise on the potential challenges for refugees in the receiving country. The cultural orientation trainings do not always happen and they differ in duration and depth. The Gateway Resettlement Programme for example, used to provide two weeks of cultural orientation when it was launched in 2004; however this has shrunk to three hours in 2016. In addition to helping refugees begin to prepare for life in a new country, cultural orientation can also contribute to the uncertainty and stress associated with resettlement.

Departure
Refugees are assisted to travel into the receiving country, usually by airplane. From being selected for resettlement to actually arriving in the US, it usually takes between 18–24 months. Refugees who are resettled in the US have to pay back a loan for their flight tickets which is provided by the International Organization for Migration (IOM).

In certain circumstances, where refugees have to be evacuated immediately from life-threatening situations in the first country of asylum, they can be brought to Emergency Transit Centres (ETC). These provide a temporary safe haven before receiving countries are ready to take them. The Timișoara Emergency Transit Centre in Romania, that opened in 2008, was Europe's first evacuation centre. The Humenné Emergency Transit Centre in Slovakia was opened in 2009. However, these ETCs together can only accommodate up to 300 people.

IOM staff escorts the refugees to the receiving country and can provide a medical escort, if needed. As most refugees have no experience of air travel, the escort assists them with the preparation for the travel and with the journey itself, guiding and monitoring them throughout the journey and until they are handed over to the post-arrival service of the receiving country.

Post-arrival
Refugees are met at the airport and get immediate integration and orientation support in most countries. Upon arrival in the country refugees have the right to reside in the country and do not need to apply for asylum. Refugees who are resettled to the US have to pay rent after six months. Once a refugee is resettled in a third country the main focus is to help them become self-sufficient.

Refugees and asylum seekers face multiple difficulties sustaining their lives in destination countries. In particular, finding and maintaining meaningful employment that provides sustainable amount of pay is very difficult for refugees in receiving countries, because they face multiple barriers related to refugee employment. One way suggested to deal with such refugee employment issues is through cross-sector collaboration, where businesses, governmental organizations, educational institutions and support organizations are engaged to share resources and knowledge to tackle the resettlement concern.

Approaches for resettlement 
One approach for refugee resettlement, especially in the United States, has been the work-first approach. The result of this approach is an increase in employment rates as refugees are provided with resources—language lessons, resume building, interview skills, etc.—that prepare them for obtaining their first job. The limits of this approach have been ignoring other factors that present as barriers to employment rates including mental and physical health problems, unfamiliarity with work and social culture in their new environment, and "brain waste" which is a term used to describe those who have professional qualifications but their English language proficiency is limited and prevents them from obtaining jobs matching their skills. This job-first focus does not take into account that refugees have limited time to adjust to their new environment and enter low-skilled jobs. It also ignores the background of refugees; this population does not receive services that match their specific needs.

Another approach has been increasing social and political power of refugees through advocacy work and at the same time involving refugees themselves through partnerships with NGOs and federal/local government. This approach can create a foundation for future collective action. Political advocacy can be most effective if members of the community themselves become involved and voice their needs, which differs in each refugee community. Efforts can be made by academics and researchers to publicize the benefits that refugees provide to their local communities, and highlight the negative consequences of their exclusion. Such scholars can testify in front of congress as non-government experts to influence policy decisions that could ultimately benefit refugees. By involving refugees in decision making and advocacy work, NGOs can teach them how to complete processes themselves starting from their arrival in the new country. This can help staff of such organizations as they would not be overwhelmed since refugees learn to fill out forms and other tasks as their language proficiency increases.

Resettlement is seen as a crucial protection tool for LGBT refugees in Turkey since they also face discrimination and cannot access rights in Turkey.

Resettlement programmes

Since 1995 Annual Tripartite Consultations on Resettlement (ATCR) are held. The UNHCR, involved or interested governments as well as NGOs come together to discuss global and national resettlement strategies, cooperations and make agreements on resettlement.
In 2012 there were 26 third countries which run specific and ongoing resettlement programmes in co-operation with the UNHCR. The largest programmes are run by the United States, Canada and Australia. A number of European countries run smaller schemes and in 2004 the United Kingdom established its own scheme, known as the Gateway Protection Programme with an initial annual quota of 750. The smallest is run by Japan which offers 30 resettlement places per year.

Europe

In September 2009, the European Commission unveiled plans for new Joint EU Resettlement Programme. The scheme would involve EU member states deciding together each year which refugees should be given priority. Member states would receive €4,000 from the European Refugee Fund per refugee resettled.

United States

The United States helped resettle roughly 2 million refugees between 1945 and 1979, when their refugee resettlement program was restructured. Refugees destined for the United States are screened by six different federal agencies. The average time it takes from the referral to the arrival of a refugee is 18 to 24 months.  The United States has an Office of Refugee Resettlement (ORR) that aids the refugees in resettlement through programs that provide them with critical resources that help them become integrated members of the American society.

In a recent exploratory study of approaches used in ORR Programs, they identified a number of key factors that contributes to successful employment: 1) pre- and post-employment services, 2) individualised goal-oriented approaches with each refugee, 3) culturally diverse staff, 4) refugees that are survivors with high levels of motivation, 5) clear message about the ORR's mission statement in all programs, and 6) proper coordination among refugee providers and between refugee and mainstream services at the system level. The ORR has also identified a number of areas of improvement in these programs such as need for understanding of employment structure of the community by refugee service agencies, more focus on the difficult to employ, increased creativity in identifying job opportunities and overcoming barriers, creating more appropriate levels of subsidy and training for each position, more understanding of cultural issues that influence program design, etc.

The number of refugees resettled to the United States is statutorily limited by an annual ceiling that the President determines each fiscal year(FY). Since 1980, around 50,000 refugees resettled each fiscal year. This year (FY 2019) the number dropped from 45,000 to 30,000, the lowest it has been in history after the brief period after 9/11. In September 2019, the Trump administration announced its intention to further reduce the refugee quota to 18,000 for the incoming fiscal year (FY 2020).

As a result of the 1980 Refugee Act, the US State Department and federal refugee resettlement program formally acknowledges and coordinates with 11 "Voluntary Agencies" (VOLAGS), which are non-governmental organizations that assist the government in the resettlement process. These organizations assist the refugees with the day-to-day needs of the large transition into a completely new culture. The US State Department and Office of Refugee Resettlement offers grants for the purpose of providing for refugees' day-to-day needs, and many VOLAGS additionally draw from their own resources and volunteers.  Most of them have local offices, and caseworkers that provide individualized aid to each refugee's situation.  They do rely on the sponsorship of individuals or groups, such as faith-based congregations or local organizations.  The largest of the VOLAGS is the Migration and Refugee Services of the U.S. Catholic Conference.  Others include Church World Service, Episcopal Migration Ministries, the Ethiopian Community Development Council, the Hebrew Immigrant Aid Society, the International Rescue Committee, Lutheran Immigration and Refugee Service, the U.S. Committee for Refugees and Immigrants, and World Relief.

There are a number of advantages to the strategy of using agencies other than the government to directly assist in resettlement.  First of all, it has been estimated that for a federal or state bureaucracy to resettle refugees instead of the VOLAGS would double the overall cost. These agencies are often able to procure large quantities of donations and, more importantly, volunteers.  According to one study, when the fact that resettlement workers often have to work nights, weekends, and overtime in order to meet the demands of the large cultural transition of new refugees is taken into account, the use of volunteers reduces the overall cost down to roughly a quarter. VOLAGS are also more flexible and responsive than the government since they are smaller and rely on their own funds.

Studies have found that refugee settlements in the United States have no impact on terrorism or crime.

Economic empowerment in the United States 
Refugee resettlement in the U.S. emerged as a response to the violence brought on by World War II that displaced millions of people in Europe. Non-governmental groups partnered with the U.S. government to respond to this humanitarian crisis in the 1930s, playing vital roles in the future in resettlement of refugees. In the next forty years, the U.S. was committed to expanding its focus to other continents as well, coordinating with Non-Governmental Organizations to help those most in need. The Refugee Act of 1980 established political asylum in the United States, creating refugee resettlement programs to ease the transition to the refugees’ life in America. One objective of the U.S. Refugee Act of 1980 was economic self-sufficiency. Efforts were made towards helping refugees find employment and cease dependence on federal/state aid. After the passage of the Personal Responsibility and Work Opportunity Reauthorization Act under President Clinton, poor families could receive support for five years provided they maintained a job search. After this period, U.S. federal law prevented any further forms of cash assistance. This affected legal immigrants/refugees as they struggled to learn English and find employment at the same time. These key events intertwined the relationship between federal/state governments and non-governmental organizations as they partnered to provide resources to refugees.

The refugee program in the US emphasizes the work-first approach. The result of this approach is an increase in employment rates as refugees are provided with resources—English language lessons, resume building, interview skills, etc.—that prepare them for obtaining their first job in the U.S. The limits of this approach have been ignoring barriers to employment rates including mental and physical health problems, and unfamiliarity with work and social culture in their new environment. This job-first focus does not take into account that refugees have limited time to adjust to their new environment. Without acknowledging people’s concerns from a bottom-up perspective (a perspective that allows refugees themselves to make informed decisions and create change for themselves), the job-first focus approach cannot be as effective. The result is underemployment. Regardless of their qualifications, new refugees take low-level jobs as janitors, hotel maids and domestic workers. Interviews with refugees often portray the shame members of the group experience, while on paper they are employed and ‘self-sufficient’. The job-first approach may be effective in helping refugees find low-skilled jobs immediately, but it ignores the underemployment rate and their other essential needs. It encourages ceasing dependence on welfare. Experts suggest that approaches must strengthen the workforce, allowing refugees to build essential skills towards further advancement in economy or education, which can be done by addressing other needs such as mental health, affordable housing, and going further than policies that determine the lowest wage needed for mere survival.

A challenge for empowerment has been determining who is responsible for providing funds. Although the U.S. Department of State has provided funding over the years, empowerment programs have struggled as the number of refugees increased and unemployment rose within the country. In communities in the US cities such as Tennessee, states and local governments experience unemployment and budget issues, and question the costs of resettlement especially regarding the use of resources to meet the housing, education, and health needs of refugees. These governments have no choice but to put the responsibility into the hands of the private sector and refugees to sustain themselves. The role of the government has become limited and they attempt to solve poverty in the cheapest manner possible, providing little public money, and without expanding the involvement of the government. This not only affects the poor within the US but refugees who struggle to find jobs. Without appropriate funding, pressure is put on local welfare agencies, giving them discretion over who obtains resources. Rationing has become a common practice found among workers at the front lines of service delivery who must balance client demand with limited resources. Under these circumstances workers will routinely expend limited resources on select clients, while withholding them from others. Street-level studies have also found that workers routinely target resources at the clients who are most likely to succeed at the desired outcomes of the intervention. Neutral legislation in practice varies across the nation since local offices have discretion over distribution of resources.

South America

Around 1,100 refugees, mainly Colombians, were resettled within South America between 2005 and 2014 through the "Solidarity Resettlement Programme". However, as many refugees expected to be resettled to the US or Europe 22% of them left again, possibly returning to the country of first asylum or the country of origin.

In 2011 the combined quota of Argentina, Brazil, Chile, Paraguay and Uruguay together was 230 resettlement places.

Resettlement gap 
The refugee resettlement gap refers to the number of refugees judged eligible for third country resettlement compared to the number of refugees who have been resettled in that year. The difference between these two figures occurs due to fluctuations in refugee needs and due to UN member state policies towards resettlement within their borders. In 2017, the UNHCR judged the number of refugees in need of resettlement to be 1.19 million. That same year, 75,200 refugees were submitted for resettlement, across all UN member states. In 2018, at the 24th Annual Tripartite Consultations on Resettlement, the UNHCR stated its intention to expand resettlement pathways and strengthen state partnerships.

See also 

 Refugee children Education

References

Refugees
Settlement schemes